Natasha Morrison (born 17 November 1992) is a Jamaican sprinter. She represented her country at the 2015 World Championships in Beijing finishing seventh in the individual 100 metres and winning gold in the 4 × 100 metres relay.

International competitions

Personal bests
Outdoor
100 metres – 10.87 (+1.3 m/s, Florida 2021)
200 metres – 23.08 (+1.6 m/s, Sundsvall 2013)
Indoor
60 metres – 7.15 (Houston 2016)

References

External links
 

1992 births
Living people
Jamaican female sprinters
World Athletics Championships athletes for Jamaica
People from Saint Catherine Parish
World Athletics Championships medalists
Commonwealth Games medallists in athletics
Commonwealth Games silver medallists for Jamaica
Athletes (track and field) at the 2018 Commonwealth Games
Competitors at the 2018 Central American and Caribbean Games
Central American and Caribbean Games gold medalists for Jamaica
Athletes (track and field) at the 2019 Pan American Games
Pan American Games competitors for Jamaica
World Athletics Championships winners
Central American and Caribbean Games medalists in athletics
Athletes (track and field) at the 2020 Summer Olympics
Olympic athletes of Jamaica
Olympic gold medalists in athletics (track and field)
Olympic gold medalists for Jamaica
Medalists at the 2020 Summer Olympics
20th-century Jamaican women
21st-century Jamaican women
Medallists at the 2018 Commonwealth Games